Eumimesis trilineata is a species of beetle in the family Cerambycidae. It was described by Magno and Monné in 1990. It is known from Brazil.

References

Calliini
Beetles described in 1990